Federico Bencovich (1667 – 8 July 1753) was a late Baroque painter from Dalmatia working in Italy. He is best known as Federico Bencovich or Federigo or Federighetto or Dalmatino. In modern Croatia he is known as Federiko Benković.

Life
He was born Federico Bencovich (as he signed his own name) somewhere in Venetian Dalmatia. His exact birthplace is unknown, but it could have been either in Omiš, Šibenik, the island of Brač, Dubrovnik, or possibly Venice itself.

His initial training was likely in Venice, but later Bencovich apprenticed with Carlo Cignani in Bologna, assisting him in 1706 in completing the frescoes of the Assumption of the Virgin on the dome of the Forlì cathedral. His first independent work, Juno on the clouds, was painted in 1705. He also appears to have worked in the studio of Giuseppe Maria Crespi.

In 1710 Bencovich painted the altarpiece of St. Andrew on the cross surrounded by St. Bartholomew, St. Carolus Borromei, St. Lucia, and St. Apollonia for the church of Madonna del Piombo in Bologna, later transferred to the parish church of Senonches near Chartres in France. By 1715, he came to the service of the Archbishop-Elector of Mainz Lothar Franz von Schönborn and was to complete four large canvas masterpieces for the gallery in the Schloss Weißenstein in the town of Pommersfelden: Apollo and Marcia, Hagar and Ishmael in the Desert, Iphigenia’s sacrifice and Abraham’s sacrifice of Isaac.

His last years were spent in Gorizia. After his death he gradually fell into oblivion, and his paintings were attributed to Piazzetta or Cignani, amongst others.

Analysis
The dramatic, often tortured, poses and lighting of his figures are placed within earthy tenebrist backgrounds.  He uses Piazzetta's and Sebastiano Ricci's unfinished and ragged brushstrokes, but superimposes a startling mystical imprint that is often foreign to the magisterial and olympian Venetian painting, and more akin to the Baroque painters from Northern Italy, Alessandro Magnasco and Francesco Cairo.

Abraham's Sacrifice of Isaac is probably the painting that disappeared from the castle of Pommersfelden at the beginning of the 19th century. Until that time, the painting was attributed to Piazzetta.

Works
Zagreb, Strossmayer Gallery, Sacrifizio d'Isacco, 1720
Forlì, Palazzo Orselli Foschi, Giunone (Juno)
Brescia, Pinacoteca Tosio Martinengo, Madonna in trono con santi (sketch)
Berlin, Staatliche Museen, Madonna e santi, 1730 – 1735
Bologna, Pinacoteca Nazionale, Il beato Pietro Gambacorta, incisione, c. 1728
Borgo San Giacomo, Verolanuova, Brescia, Chiesa del Castello: Deposizione, c. 1735
Crema, Church of the Holy Trinity: Estasi di S. Francesco da Paola, 1724
Pommersfelden, Weißenstein Castle, Hagar and Ishmael in the desert; The Sacrifice of Iphigenia, c. 1715.
Senonches, France, parish, Crucifixion of St. Andrew and Saints, c. 1725
Stuttgart, Staats-Galerie, Adoration of the Magi, c. 1725
Tomo, Feltre, parish, Fuga in Egitto, c. 1709
Venice,  Church of S. Sebastiano: Il beato Pietro Gambacorta, c. 1726
Venice, Gallerie dell'Accademia, Autoritratto, c. 1735
Venice, Museo Correr, Fuga in Egitto, drawings, c. 1720
Vienna, Albertina: Departing for Egypt, Rest while escaping in Egypt, c. 1745; drawings: St. Francis of Paola; Ecstasy of St. Francis of Assisi; Death of St. Benedict

References

External links

1667 births
1753 deaths
17th-century Croatian people
18th-century Croatian people
18th-century Italian people
17th-century Italian painters
Italian male painters
18th-century Italian painters
Dalmatian Italians
Bencovich, Federigo
Croatian painters
Italian people of Croatian descent
People from Dalmatia
18th-century Italian male artists